Kenana Airport  is an airstrip serving the production site of Kenana Sugar Company, approximately  southeast of Rabak in Sudan.

Sifeiya is the community surrounding the airport, and adjacent to the sugar plantation.

Kenana Air Base

The airport hosts two Sudanese Air Force units

 Transport Training Squadron (Antonov An-2)
 Helicopter Training School (Mil Mi-2)

See also
Transport in Sudan

References

Airports in Sudan